Delta Lambda Phi is an international social fraternity for gay, bisexual, transgender and progressive men. It offers a social environment and structure similar to other Greek-model college fraternities. The fraternity was founded on October 15, 1986, by Vernon L. Strickland III in Washington, D.C.: becoming the first national social fraternity for gay, bisexual, and straight progressive men. The full, corporate name of the fraternity is Delta Lambda Phi Social Fraternity, but it is commonly referred to as "DLP" by its members. As of 2007, DLP was one of the fastest-growing fraternities in the United States.

History
Delta Lambda Phi was founded in Washington, D.C., on October 15, 1986, by Vernon L. Strickland III, a law student at Georgetown University. Strickland had been acting as informal legal counsel to another student who had been denied fraternity membership due to the presumption that he was gay. When Strickland became aware of other examples of this, he began organizing a fraternity with a more welcoming model.

The fraternity was incorporated in D.C. on September 10, 1987. In April, 1988 a group of gay men at UCLA were recognized as the first Delta Lambda Phi chapter to be affiliated with a university.

Membership 

Delta Lambda Phi's membership is open to all men whether they are gay, bisexual, transgender, or straight. 

There are three types of chapters: campus-based, multi-campus based, and community based. Campus and multi-campus chapters are generally open to male college-aged students who live in the area. Community-based chapters do not require their members to be students. Delta Lambda Phi strictly prohibits hazing, and it adheres to an extensive, fraternity-wide Risk Management Policy.  

Delta Lambda Phi has been a member of the North American Interfraternity Conference (NIC) since 2013. The fraternity was the first (and as of 2013 only) cultural interest fraternity for gay, bisexual, transgender, and progressive men.

Purposes 

The three purposes of the fraternity are:
 To develop dignified and purposeful social, service, and recreational activities for all men, irrespective of sexual orientation or gender expression;
 To lead in determining the rights and privileges of individuals in society; and,
 To present a strong and positive image which respects the diversity of all individuals.

Symbols and traditions 
The heraldic crest of Delta Lambda Phi contains eleven symbolic elements, each of which carries a special meaning.

The fraternity's mascot is the Lambda Centaur, which is modeled after Chiron, the only immortal centaur from Greek mythology who was regarded as gentle and wise.

The fraternity's colors are green and gold, although white does appear in reference to the fraternity's alumni members. The fraternity flower is the yellow rose.

The fraternity's song, "Delta Phi", has two distinct melodies. The first is a somber ceremonial version, while the second is a festive toast version. Both versions utilize the same set of lyrics. The official song has three verses, but every chapter writes a unique fourth verse to commemorate the founding of their individual chapter.

The formal motto of the fraternity is "Lambda Men are Making Their Presence Make A Difference."

The highest honor bestowed by Delta Lambda Phi is the Vernon L. Strickland III Founder's Award for extraordinary service to the fraternity's brotherhood.

Structure and policies

Convention 
Delta Lambda Phi is governed by its Convention, which is officially the highest authority in the fraternity. The convention is held annually and, as a body, comprises two members from every active chapter, as well as alumni representatives and the fraternity's board of directors. The first Convention was held in 1989 in San Francisco, California. The location of the Convention changes from year to year and is selected by the fraternity staff.

Board of directors 
The fraternity's board of directors (BOD) governs the fraternity between conventions and consists of eleven elected members, three ex officio members, and Life Members.

The executive director (ED) and general counsel are appointed by the trustee and confirmed by the board of directors. The ED's principal responsibility is to direct the day-to-day affairs of the fraternity. Members who have served the on the board for ten or more years can be appointed "Life Member of the Board" by action of the Annual Convention.

The fraternity recognizes three broad geographic regions—Eastern, Central, and Western. Each region is overseen by a regional steering committee, and also hosts two regional conferences; one in the spring, and one in the fall. Like the location of Convention, regional conference locations are generally rotated.

Delta Lambda Phi Alumni Association (DLPAA) 
The Delta Lambda Phi Alumni Association (DLPAA) is governed by its own elected board of directors. Since January 2004, the DLPAA has sponsored an annual alumni retreat. This retreat provides alumni an opportunity to get acquainted or reacquainted. The DLPAA also allows for the creation of local alumni associations (LAAs). LAAs can be either in support of a specific chapter, or location based.

The Delphi Foundation 
Delta Lambda Phi also has a separately incorporated 501(c)(3) educational foundation, the Delphi Foundation. The president of The Delphi Foundation is J. Marshall Smith (Beta Alpha chapter).

"Hands-Off" policy 

Delta Lambda Phi observes a strict brother/pledge relations policy. Sexual relationships between brothers and pledges are forbidden. The policy governing these relationships is the Corporate Brother-Pledge Relations Policy, known informally as the "Hands-Off Policy". The policy has existed in various forms since the early years of the fraternity, and it was codified and adopted by the DLP National Convention in 1998. Many chapters also adopt their own local hands-off policy consistent with the corporate policy, often intended to expand or clarify it.

The Corporate Brother-Pledge Relations Policy states that brothers and pledges may not engage in "extra-fraternal relations" during the course of the rush and pledge education periods. The policy aims to ensure that bid distribution remains fair, that pledge education is focused on platonic fraternal bonding, and that the risk of sexual harassment is minimized.

No corporate policy exists prohibiting two members from engaging in extra-fraternal relations after they have both become brothers. Because the student-teacher relationship that existed during the pledge education process no longer exists, all brothers are regarded as peers and are simply encouraged to exercise their best judgment.

Chapters 

Delta Lambda Phi chapters are assigned a sequential Greek letter designation according to the order in which they were chartered. The oldest is the Alpha chapter, located in Washington, D.C. Subsequent chapters were assigned successive letters of the Greek alphabet. After all single-letter designations were used, chapters were assigned double-letter combinations in the fashion "Alpha Alpha," "Alpha Beta," "Alpha Gamma," etc. The designation "Alpha Omega" is reserved as a symbolic "Chapter Eternal" for members who have died.

Unlike many other fraternities, Delta Lambda Phi allows for multi-campus based chapters in addition to more traditional single-campus-based chapters.

Below is a list of all of the fraternity's active chapters:
 Alpha – George Washington University, Washington, DC
 Iota – California State University, Sacramento, CA
 Rho – California State University, Long Beach, Long Beach, CA
 Psi – University of Washington, Seattle, WA
 Omega – University of Arizona, Tucson, AZ
 Beta Xi – New York University, New York, NY
 Beta Omicron – Bowling Green State University, Bowling Green, OH
 Gamma Gamma – University of Iowa, Iowa City, IA

Delta Lambda Phi also has several active provisional chapters. Provisional chapters do not have Greek letter designations and are instead identified by their city or school.
 University of Louisiana at Lafayette, Lafayette, LA
 University of Colorado Denver, Denver, CO
 Virginia Tech, Blacksburg, VA

Notable alumni
 Todd Gloria - Mayor of San Diego
 Henry Berg-Brousseau - Transgender rights activist

See also 

 List of LGBT and LGBT-friendly fraternities and sororities

References

External links 
 Delta Lambda Phi Corporate Website
 DLP Alumni Association
 Delphi Foundation

1986 establishments in Washington, D.C.
International student societies
North American Interfraternity Conference
Student societies in the United States
LGBT youth organizations based in the United States
Fraternities and sororities in the United States
LGBT fraternities and sororities
Student organizations established in 1986
LGBT in Washington, D.C.